Manners Hill Park is a public park in Peppermint Grove, Western Australia.

Location
Manners Hill park is located in Peppermint Grove, an affluent suburb of Perth.

It is surrounded by Johnston Street, Bay View Terrace, Keane Street and Lilla Street.

History
The land was originally owned by Edward Keane, the Mayor of Perth from 1891 to 1892, who used it as a cow paddock. 

In 1903, architect Talbot Hobbs designed a pavilion which was built later that year. It obtained its current name in April 1934 when the Peppermint Grove Road Board named it in honour of its chairman and his sixteen years service to it, J. Manners Hill. Prior to that, it was known as Kean's Point reserve.

Later, several other amenities were added, such as a dog exercise area, public toilets, and the tennis courts of the Peppermint Grove Tennis Club.

References

Urban public parks
Parks in Perth, Western Australia
Peppermint Grove, Western Australia